The 2004 Australian Grand Prix (officially the 2004 Foster's Australian Grand Prix) was a Formula One motor race held on 7 March 2004 at the Melbourne Grand Prix Circuit. It was Race 1 of 18 in the 2004 FIA Formula One World Championship. Michael Schumacher won the race for Ferrari from pole position in dominant fashion, with his teammate Rubens Barrichello finishing behind him in second. This 1–2 finish gave Ferrari a strong 9-point lead in the constructors' standings after just one race. Williams and Renault each had both cars finish in the points while McLaren, a team that had enjoyed success in years preceding this, only managed one point, with David Coulthard finishing a lapped 8th. The 1-2 finish for Schumacher and Barrichello was the first one-two finish for their Ferrari team since the 2002 Japanese Grand Prix.

This race marked the first time since the 2001 San Marino Grand Prix that cars competed without using fully-automatic gearboxes and launch control, which were both banned by the FIA after the  season. The use of traction control was still permitted by the FIA, and would continue to be used over the next three seasons, until being banned for the  season.

This race also marked 150th Grand Prix races for McLaren and Mercedes engine partnership since 1995.

Report

Friday drivers
The bottom 6 teams in the 2003 Constructors' Championship were entitled to run a third car in free practice on Friday. These drivers drove on Friday but did not compete in qualifying or the race.

Leinders was entered as Third Driver but was refused a superlicence until he completed the required mileage in an F1 car. He satisfied this requirement before the next race.

Qualifying
Qualifying resulted in a Ferrari one-two, with Juan Pablo Montoya third on the grid for Williams. Gianmaria Bruni, Christian Klien and Olivier Panis all failed to set a qualifying time.

Race
At the start, Alonso was up and away and ahead of Button and looking for a way to deal with Montoya while Jarno Trulli went from ninth on the grid to be fifth out of the first corner. He was aided in his task by Montoya, who went howling down to Turn 1, braked just a hint too late and Montoya was jumped by the Renault of Fernando Alonso as he tried to stay ahead of the surging Alonso. He went off and Alonso had to put some wheels on the grass to avoid a disaster. Montoya went back to seventh. That condemned the Colombian to an afternoon stuck in traffic and put paid to any challenge there might have been for Alonso. Behind all this there were a few wheels off the grass as others sorted themselves out (notably both Saubers) while Takuma Sato bumped the rear end of Trulli's Renault, slightly (but significantly) damaging both cars.

The Ferraris were gone already and as the afternoon developed all that Fernando Alonso could do was to watch the rears of the two red cars as they disappeared from his view. It did not take long. By the fourth lap they were two seconds ahead. By the eighth lap they were five seconds clear and after that Alonso had nothing to do. No one else could keep up with him. Sauber's Giancarlo Fisichella had a long battle for position in the midfield with Jordan's Nick Heidfeld. Fisichella passed Heidfeld, who later dropped out of the race with a transmission failure. Heidfeld was involved in an incident in the pit lane where the mechanic Matt Deane and refueller Mick Gomme were hit by the car and suffered some bruising. Montoya attempted to regain the place by going around the outside of the Spaniard into the first turn, but outbraked himself and ran wide. This dropped him behind his teammate Ralf Schumacher, who'd qualified 8th. Despite repassing Ralf Schumacher on-track, the Colombian ended up behind him again by the race's end in fifth place. The race proved that Ferrari once again had a dominant car, with Michael Schumacher winning from teammate Rubens Barrichello in Ferrari's first one-two since Japan 2002, while the rest of the field was over 20 seconds behind. Schumacher led every one of the 58 race laps. At the start, Montoya was jumped by the Renault of Fernando Alonso.

Fernando Alonso gave Renault a podium with third place, while Jenson Button got BAR off the mark with sixth. Jarno Trulli finished 7th in the Renault and was the first lapped runner. McLaren seemed to be less competitive than in recent years, with Kimi Räikkönen becoming the first retirement of the year, dropping out with an engine problem, and with David Coulthard picking up just 1 point in eighth place.

Classification

Qualifying

Race

Championship standings after the race 

Drivers' Championship standings

Constructors' Championship standings

Note: Only the top five positions are included for both sets of standings.

Footnotes

References

Grand Prix
Australian Grand Prix
Australian Grand Prix
Australian Grand Prix